Ben Hayslip (born March 11, 1970 in Evans, Georgia) is an American country music songwriter.

Early life
Hayslip first attended Valdosta High School in Valdosta GA where he was a freshman quarterback for the 1984 State and National champion Valdosta Wildcats.  In 1985 his family relocated to Evans, Georgia where Hayslip attended Evans High School near Augusta, Georgia.  Hayslip became a four-year starter and an All-State first baseman helping to lead the Evans baseball team to a runner-up finish in the 1985 State Championship.  In his senior year, his Evans Knights won the 1988 Georgia state championship, finishing with  a 29-1 record and a #3 national ranking by USA Today. Hayslip also participated in the Georgia High School Association's North/South All-Star Game with other top baseball recruits.   After graduation, Hayslip attended Georgia Southern University to play baseball where he was a member of the 1990 team that participated in the College World Series in Omaha, Nebraska. Hayslip graduated from Georgia Southern University in 1994. In the same year, Hayslip moved to Nashville, Tennessee to pursue a career in country music.

Career
Hayslip has co-written many hit songs including "Put a Girl in It" by Brooks & Dunn, "Barefoot and Crazy" by Jack Ingram, "Gimmie That Girl" and "The Shape I'm In" by Joe Nichols, "Long, Slow Kisses" by Jeff Bates, "I'll Just Hold On", "All About Tonight" and "Honey Bee" by Blake Shelton, "All Over Me" by Josh Turner, "Farmer's Daughter" by Rodney Atkins, "Broken In" by Trent Willmon, "Summer Thing" by Troy Olsen and "Chicken and Biscuits" by Colt Ford. Hayslip also co-wrote Martina McBride's single "I'm Gonna Love You Through It", Luke Bryan's "I Don't Want This Night to End", Craig Morgan's "This Ole Boy", Jason Aldean's "The Only Way I Know" and "When She Says Baby", Chris Young's "I Can Take It from There", Jake Owen's "Anywhere with You", Justin Moore's "Point at You", Thomas Rhett's "It Goes Like This", Dustin Lynch's "Wild in Your Smile" and Craig Campbell's "Keep Them Kisses Comin'" Luke Bryan's "Huntin', Fishin' and Lovin' Every Day", Dustin Lynch's "Mind Reader" and Thomas Rhett's Star of the Show. Many were collaborations with fellow Georgia natives, Rhett Akins and Dallas Davidson. The trio of songwriters are known as The Peach Pickers. In April 2010, "Gimme That Girl" went to number one on the country music singles charts, the first Hayslip written song to do so. "All About Tonight", "All Over Me", "Honey Bee", "I Don't Want This Night to End" and "The Only Way I Know" all reached number one on the country music charts also.

Hayslip won ASCAP Songwriter of the Year in 2011 and 2012.  Hayslip has won twenty ASCAP awards and two song of the year Awards for "Honey Bee" and "It Goes Like This"

In 2011, 2013 and 2014 and 2018, Hayslip received the CMA Triple Play Award for having three #1 songs in a twelve-month period. Hayslip was also named ASCAP'S 2011 and 2012 Songwriter of the Year.

In 2009, Hayslip had twenty-nine cuts by various artists.

Discography

Personal life
He married his wife, Melissa, in 1997. They have three children, Tarver, Camden and Knox. They live in Lebanon, TN.

References

American country songwriters
American male songwriters
Living people
People from Evans, Georgia
Musicians from Nashville, Tennessee
1970 births